General elections were held in Saint Lucia on 25 June 1964. The result was a victory for the United Workers Party, which won six of the ten seats. Voter turnout was 51.8%.

Results

References

Saint Lucia
Elections in Saint Lucia
1964 in Saint Lucia
June 1964 events in North America